El Tren de la Fresa or the Strawberry Train is an heritage train service operated on the railway that was inaugurated on 9 February 1851 between Madrid and Aranjuez as the second railway line in mainland Spain. The original purpose of the  railway was to connect Spain's capital with the Royal Palace of Aranjuez. It was called the "Tren de la Fresa", the "Strawberry Train," as it originally went past vast fields of strawberries en route. Fresa con Nata (Strawberries with whipped cream) is a speciality produce of the town.

The excursions run from Spring (late April or early May) to late June or early July and then again from mid-September to mid-October. The train departs from the Railway Museum housed in the old Las Delicias station, arriving fifty minutes later in Aranjuez. The return journey departs from Aranjuez at 18:25, arriving in Madrid at 19:15.

The train is usually pulled by a steam locomotive and includes 6 wooden coaches of nineteenth century vintage but for the 2013 season RENFE has declared that a conventional electric or diesel locomotive will be used to pull vintage carriages.

The ticket includes a guided visit to the historic part of Aranjuez, the Royal palace and its gardens. Passengers also receive en route a plate of the famous local strawberries from hostesses dressed in nineteenth century period costumes.

References

25 years  of the Strawberry Train by the Aranjuez Municipal archivist - in Spanish

Heritage railways in Spain